The Quincy Memorial Bridge is a truss bridge over the Mississippi River in Quincy, Illinois. It brings eastbound U.S. Highway 24 into the city of Quincy from Missouri. It was built in 1930, initially as a toll bridge, and remains structurally sound.

Building of the bridge began in 1928 by the Kelly-Atkinson Company. It was completed in 1930, with the first car crossing the bridge on May 19th of that year on an official inspection trip. The original toll for the bridge was 50 cents, by 1945 the city had paid the outstanding bonds which financed the bridge's construction, and the fares were eliminated.

In 1986, to serve additional traffic volumes crossing the Mississippi River into Quincy, the Illinois Department of Transportation constructed the Bayview Bridge just to the north of the Memorial Bridge. Westbound traffic was then routed onto the Bayview Bridge, while eastbound traffic was routed onto the Memorial Bridge.

Since 2012, demolition and replacement of the historic Memorial Bridge with a more modern one is being considered by the Illinois Department of Transportation to cope with increased traffic demands on the aging bridge.

See also
 
 
 
 
 List of crossings of the Upper Mississippi River

References

 Weeks III, John A. "US-24 Quincy Bayview & Memorial Bridges Quincy, MO" [sic]. http://www.johnweeks.com/upper_mississippi/pagesB/umissB13.html. Retrieved January 14, 2006.
 Unknown. "Should we build a new bridge?" WQAD. November 26, 2003. Retrieved January 14, 2006.

Truss bridges in the United States
Bridges over the Mississippi River
Road bridges in Illinois
Bridges of the United States Numbered Highway System
Quincy–Hannibal area
Monuments and memorials in Illinois
Monuments and memorials in Missouri
Bridges completed in 1928
U.S. Route 24
Buildings and structures in Marion County, Missouri
Road bridges in Missouri
Former toll bridges in Illinois
Former toll bridges in Missouri
1930 establishments in Illinois
1930 establishments in Missouri
Interstate vehicle bridges in the United States